Manie van Dyk is a South African politician, a former Member of Parliament with the Democratic Alliance, and the Shadow Minister of Public Enterprises.

References 

Living people
1955 births
Afrikaner people
South African people of Dutch descent
Democratic Alliance (South Africa) politicians
Members of the National Assembly of South Africa